Senne Lammens (born 7 July 2002) is a Belgian professional footballer who plays as a goalkeeper for Belgian First Division B side Club NXT.

Club career
Lammens began his career at the youth academy of Club Brugge. On 11 December 2019 the then 17-year old goalkeeper scored the decisive headed goal (2-2) against Real Madrid CF (youth) in the 95th minute of the play-off match in the 2019–20 UEFA Youth League group stage, enabling his team to reach the knock-out phase of the tournament.

Career statistics

Club

Honours
Club Brugge
 Belgian Super Cup: 2021

References

External links
Profile at the Club Brugge website

2002 births
Living people
Belgian footballers
Club NXT players
Club Brugge KV players
Belgian Pro League players
Challenger Pro League players
People from Erpe-Mere
Footballers from East Flanders
Association football goalkeepers